This is a list of A-League Women records and statistics.

Club honours

Champions
This is a list of the clubs that have won the finals series (play-offs), where the winning team is crowned as the A-League Women (previously W-League) champions.

The numbers in brackets indicate the number of championships won by a team.

Premiers
This is a list of the teams that have won the premiership of the A-League Women (previously W-League).

<small>The numbers in brackets indicate the number of premierships won by a team.</small>

Summary

Individual honours

Julie Dolan Medal

The medal is awarded annually to the player voted to be the best player in the W-League, the top women's football (soccer) league in Australia. The award is named after former Matildas Captain and football administrator Julie Dolan. The format was changed for the 2015–16 season, with a panel featuring former players, media, referees and technical staff, who voted on each regular-season match.   The following table contains only the winners of the medal during the W-League era. The award was also presented for the best player in the previous Women's National Soccer League prior to the W-League.

Young Footballer of the Year

FMA Player of the Year

Player's Player of the Year

Goalkeeper of the Year (Golden Glove)

Golden Boot

Goal of the Year

Coach of the Year

Referee of the Year

Fair Play Award

Club records
Biggest victories

Highest aggregate scores

W-League streaksupdated to end 2021–22 seasonPlayer recordsAs of 1 December 2021 (prior to commencement of 2021–22 A-League Women season).Players listed in bold are still actively playing in the A-League Women.

Top scorersAs of 11 April 2021 (end of 2020–21 post-season).Most Goals In A Match

Most hat-tricks

Fastest hat-tricks

All-time W-League ladders
Regular season matchesAs of the end of the 2020–21 regular season, ranked by average points per game

Finals matchesAs of the end of the 2020–21 post-season''

See also

List of A-League Women hat-tricks

Notes

References

A-League Women records and statistics 
Australia
Women's association football records and statistics
A-League Women lists